Uncompahgre Peak is the sixth highest summit of the Rocky Mountains of North America and the U.S. state of Colorado.  The prominent  fourteener is the highest summit of the San Juan Mountains and the highest point in the drainage basin of the Colorado River and the Gulf of California.  It is located in the Uncompahgre Wilderness in the northern San Juans, in northern Hinsdale County approximately 7 miles (11 km) west of the town of Lake City.

The south, east and west sides are not particularly steep, but the north face has a  cliff. Like all peaks in the San Juan Mountains, Uncompahgre is of volcanic origin, but is not a volcano. The rock is of poor quality for climbing, precluding an ascent of the north face.

The most popular route for climbing Uncompahgre Peak is Uncompahgre National Forest Service Trail Number 239, which starts from the end of the Nellie Creek Road, east-southeast of the peak. It accesses the summit in a winding ascent, starting from the east, passing over a south-trending ridge, and finishing on the west slopes of the summit plateau.

The peak's name comes from the Ute word Uncompaghre, which loosely translates to "dirty water" or "red water spring" and is likely a reference to the many hot springs in the vicinity of Ouray, Colorado.

Historical names
Mount Chauvenet - 1873
Unca-pah-gre Mountain
Uncompahgre Mountain
Uncompahgre Peak – 1907

See also

List of mountain peaks of North America
List of mountain peaks of the United States
List of mountain peaks of Colorado
List of Colorado county high points
List of Colorado fourteeners

References

Notes

External links

Uncompahgre Peak on 14ers.com
Photo Journal of a Trip up Uncompahgre
Uncompahgre Peak on Distantpeak.com
Uncompahgre Peak on Summitpost

Fourteeners of Colorado
Mountains of Hinsdale County, Colorado
San Juan Mountains (Colorado)
North American 4000 m summits
Uncompahgre National Forest
Mountains of Colorado